Divshal (also Romanized as Dīvshal; also known as Bījār Bāgh Dīvshal and Bījār Bāgh-e Dīvshal) is a village in Divshal Rural District, in the Central District of Langarud County, Gilan Province, Iran. At the 2006 census, its population was 2,268, with 663 families.

References 

Populated places in Langarud County